Valamrud (also Romanized as Valamrūd) is a village in Baladeh Rural District, Khorramabad District, Tonekabon County, Mazandaran Province, Iran. At the 2006 census, its population was 129, in 35 families.

References 

Populated places in Tonekabon County